Leandro Campagna (born 24 May 1994) is an Italian footballer who plays for A.C. Bra.

Biography
Born in Latina, Lazio region, Campagna started his career at Lazio club Frosinone. He was the member of under-16–17 mixed team in 2009–10 and 2010–11 season. He also played 9 times for the under-20 reserve in 2010–11. Campagna made his senior debut on the last round of 2010–11 Serie B, which the first team certainly relegated. With the return of Mirko Gori from Parma, they were the protagonist for the under-19 reserve to win the league dedicated to Lega Pro clubs. Campagna scored a goal as a substitute in the final. For the first team, Campagna played twice in 2011–12 Lega Pro Prima Divisione. In January 2013, Campagna was signed by Parma in temporary deal with option to sign half of the registration rights, re-joining former Frosinone team-mate Daniele Abbracciante. Frosinone also signed forward Gianluca Lapadula from Cesena and Parma that month as reinforcement. On 20 June 2013 Parma excised the option for €600,000 transfer fee in 5-year contract. On 30 June 2013 Parma sold half of the "card" of forward Daniel Ciofani to Frosinone for €600,000 as compensation . Campagna returned to Frosinone in temporary deal but failed to play any game. After Ciofani was signed outright, Campagna returned to Parma on 27 January 2014 but immediately departed for Barletta.

In summer 2014 he was signed by Melfi in temporary deal. On 2 February 2015 Campagna returned to Parma, with Alessandro Luparini moved from Parma to Melfi.
He remained unattached on July 1, 2015, as Parma was dissolved due to financial troubles. He was signed by Latina on November 6, 2015, signing a contract that will keep him in the club until June 2016.

On 3 January 2020, Campagna joined Serie D club A.C. Bra.

References

External links
 Lega Serie B profile 
 

Italian footballers
Frosinone Calcio players
Parma Calcio 1913 players
S.S. Arezzo players
A.S.D. Barletta 1922 players
A.S. Melfi players
Latina Calcio 1932 players
U.S. Catanzaro 1929 players
Scandicci Calcio players
A.C. Bra players
Serie B players
Serie C players
Serie D players
Italy youth international footballers
Association football forwards
People from Latina, Lazio
1994 births
Living people
Footballers from Lazio
Sportspeople from the Province of Latina